The Avery Depot in Avery, Idaho was built by the Chicago, Milwaukee, St. Paul and Pacific Railroad (also known as The Milwaukee Road) in 1909 as part of its Pacific Extension into the Pacific Northwest from Chicago, Illinois. Avery was the west end of overhead catenary,  which allowed electric locomotives to operate instead of steam engines.

The depot is a rectangular single story wood-frame building built in the Craftsman style. At one end is the passenger waiting area with a freight room at the other end. The station agent's office and lunch room ("beanery") are located between the two.

When the railroad went bankrupt in the 1980s, the depot was sold to the town of Avery for use as a community center.

The depot was added to the National Register of Historic Places due to its association with the Great Fire of 1910 as an evacuation site.

References
 Anonymous. Avery Depot, North Idaho 1910 Fire Sites Thematic Group. On file at the National Park Service, Washington, DC. n.d.
Sims, Cort.  National Park Service, Washington, DC. 1984. PDF accessed August 23, 2008.

Railway stations on the National Register of Historic Places in Idaho
Railway stations in the United States opened in 1909
Former Chicago, Milwaukee, St. Paul and Pacific Railroad stations
Transportation in Shoshone County, Idaho
National Register of Historic Places in Shoshone County, Idaho
Former railway stations in Idaho